Wang Liqun (born 1945) is a Chinese historian and a professor in the School of Arts, Henan University. He is best known for conducting lecture series about Chinese history on the CCTV-10 television programme Lecture Room.

Life
Wang was born in 1945 in Huoshan County, Anhui, but his ancestral home was in Xintai, Shandong. He moved to Kaifeng, Henan in 1953 and has been living there since. He is a professor in the School of Arts, Henan University. He is also a consultant in the China Shi Ji Research Association and the vice chairman of the Wen Xuan Society. He was a member of the 10th Henan Chinese People's Political Consultative Conference Provincial Committee.

In 2006, Wang received an invitation to be a lecturer on the television programme Lecture Room shown on CCTV-10. Since then, he has conducted five lecture series—Xiang Yu, Empress Lü, Emperor Wu of Han, Qin Shi Huang, and Song of the Great Wind—on the history of the Qin and Han dynasties. He has received good reviews and awards for his lectures and works.

References

1945 births
Living people
People's Republic of China historians
People from Lu'an
Historians from Anhui
Academic staff of Henan University
Educators from Anhui